Sphenomorphus scutatus, the Palau ground skink, is a species of skink found in Palau.

References

scutatus
Taxa named by Wilhelm Peters
Reptiles described in 1867
Reptiles of Palau